Your Face or Mine? is the second release by North Carolina music group, Nantucket. Although considered the better album of the two, its sales paled in comparison to those of its self-titled predecessor. Featured songs include "Gimme Your Love" and "California". Your Face or Mine? was released on compact disc by re-issue label Wounded Bird Records in 2004.

Track listing
Gimme Your Love (Redd)  – 4:15
I Live For Your Love (Redd)  – 3:06
Hey, Hey Blondie (Redd)  – 3:39
California (Redd)  – 4:11
Wide Awake (Redd) - 3:30
Don't Hang Up (Redd) - 4:13
Your Place or Mine (Redd) - 3:35
Just the Devil's Way (Redd) - 4:10
Is It Wrong To Rock And Roll (Redd) - 5:18

Personnel
 Tommy Redd: Lead & Rhythm Guitars, Spoon, Lead & Background Vocals
 Larry Uzzell: Lead & Background Vocals, Bass Guitar, Percussion
 Mike Uzzell: Organ, Moog Bass & Synthesizer, Piano, Lead & Background Vocals
 Mark Downing: Lead, Rhythm & Slide Guitars, 12-String Guitar, Pedal Guitar, Background Vocals
 Eddie Blair: Tenor & Soprano Saxophones, Piano, Organ, Clavinet, Background Vocals
 Kenny Soule: Drums, Tympani, Background Vocals

References
 Allmusic. [ Nantucket: Credits]. Retrieved Apr. 21, 2007.
 Nantucket - A Band Of Desperate Men (PKM). Nantucket: Credits. Retrieved Apr. 21, 2007.

External links
 [ Nantucket on Allmusic]
 Unofficial Nantucket Fansite
 Nantucket on MySpace

1979 albums
Nantucket (band) albums
Epic Records albums